The Negros Trench is an oceanic trench located northeast of the Sulu Trench and west of Negros Island Region in Visayas, the trench is located in the Sunda Plate in the southwestern region of the Pacific Ocean. The depth of the Negros Trench is unknown, in contrast it's neighboring trench the Sulu Trench has a depth of 5,600. During the Early-Miocine, the Sunda Plate  subducted below the Philippine Mobile Belt, which would later form the Negros Trench.

Background 
The Negros trench was formed from subduction of the Eurasian Plate underneath the Philippine Sea plate which initiated during the Early Miocene (23.03-20.44 million years ago),  The trench was previously the site of a collision zone with the Palawan plate, which formed the Philippine Trench 8–9 million years ago, This trench is located west of the Visayan Islands. This trench moves 2–3 cm/year.

Although there are vast areas of subduction zones, some authors have considered this region to have low seismic activity. There has been a decent amount of earthquakes with a magnitude ≥6.4 in the region, with the most recent occurring in 2011. It hit the trench in a depth of 19.0 km. Areas adjacent to the subduction zones have experienced large seismic activity.

Seismicity

References

Geology of the Philippines
Philippine tectonics
Subduction zones
Natural history of the Philippines
Oceanic trenches of the South China Sea